A. Marthanda Pillai- MS (Neuro), MNAMS (Neuro), FRCS, is an Indian neurosurgeon. In 2011 he was the recipient of a Padma Shri Award for medicine. He is the first former National President and former Vice-President of the Indian Medical Association (IMA) in Kerala State to receive this national award. He led the protest against proposed National Medical Commission Bill for IMA.

In the private sector he is currently the Managing Director of Ananthapuri Hospitals & Research Institute in Trivandrum.

References

Living people
Medical doctors from Thiruvananthapuram
Indian neurosurgeons
Recipients of the Padma Shri in medicine
Year of birth missing (living people)
Missing middle or first names
20th-century Indian medical doctors
20th-century surgeons